The Archive: Live, Lost & Found is a compilation album by emcee Rakim, featuring live performances, unreleased and rare material. It was released on March 4, 2008, by Koch Records. The album just managed to make it to the Top R&B/Hip-Hop Albums, peaking at #99.

Track list

References

Rakim albums
2008 albums